Metin Hüseyin is a Turkish-Cypriot-British television and film director.

Career 
Hüseyin's debut film, Tight Trousers, was nominated for a BAFTA Film Award for Best Short Film in 1989, and in 1998 he received an RTS award and a British Academy Television Award nomination for Common as Muck, and The History of Tom Jones, a Foundling won three BAFTAs. In 2002, he directed the film Anita and Me.

Hüseyin has also directed episodes of various television series, including The All New Alexei Sayle Show, Randall and Hopkirk, Kingdom, Merlin, Shameless, and Krypton.

Filmography

References

External links 
Metin Hüseyin at the bbc.co.uk Guide to Comedy

Living people
British film directors
British television directors
British people of Turkish Cypriot descent
Year of birth missing (living people)